The World Group II was the second-highest level of Fed Cup competition in 2015. The winning nations advanced to the World Group Play-offs, and the losing nations relegated to the World Group II Play-offs.

Netherlands vs. Slovakia

Romania vs. Spain

Sweden vs. Switzerland

Argentina vs. USA

References 

World Group II